The Cabinet of President Goodluck Jonathan was appointed by Acting President Goodluck Jonathan of Nigeria a few weeks after he took office during the terminal illness of President Umaru Yar'Adua.

First cabinet – 2010
On 13 January 2010, a federal court empowered Jonathan to manage state affairs while Yar'Adua received medical treatment in Saudi Arabia, and on 9 February 2010 the Nigerian Senate confirmed him as Acting President.
On 10 February 2010, Jonathan demoted Minister of Justice Michael Aondoakaa to Special Duties, replacing him by Prince Adetokunbo Kayode.
Jonathan retained the remainder Yar'Adua's cabinet until 16 March 2010, when he dissolved it in an assertion of his authority over a divided administration where some members questioned his right to act as president.
On 6 April 2010, Jonathan swore in his new cabinet.
Yar'Adua died on 5 May 2010, and Jonathan was sworn in as president the next day.

Minister in the first cabinet were:

July 2011 cabinet

In July 2011, after the start of his second term, Jonathan appointed a new cabinet.  Members included:

See also
Cabinet of Nigeria

References

Federal ministers of Nigeria
Federal Ministries of Nigeria
Goodluck Jonathan